In management it has been said that business transformation involves making fundamental changes in how  business is conducted in order to help cope with shifts in market environment. However this is a relatively narrow definition that overlooks other reasons and ignores other rationales.

A better understanding is achieved by considering that "transformation [..] is generally a response to two things. First, there are underlying problems or causes of organisational pain that need to be addressed. They have to be properly understood but nevertheless they are a key component. Second, there is a desire by the top management and other senior stakeholders to use the opportunity of addressing these causes in ways that fundamentally alter the paradigm of the organisation." Others describe Business Transformation as "the process of fundamentally changing the systems, processes, people and technology across a whole business or business unit. As such, a business transformation project is likely to include any number of change management projects, each focused on an individual process, system, technology, team or department."

When business transformation is used
The need for business transformation may be caused by external changes in the market such as an organisation's products or services being out of date, funding or income streams being changed, new regulations coming into force or market competition becoming more intense. This management approach may also incorporate business process reengineering (BPR). However application of BPR does not of itself constitute a business transformation, the outcome should be the deciding factor as to whether any activity is truly transformational or simply improvement. Other methods like Lean or Six Sigma are rooted in incremental improvement rather than paradigm shifts in the way things are done:
 To increase revenue or market share
 To improve customer satisfaction
 To cut costs

Components
Business transformation is achieved by one or more of: realigning the way staff work, how the organization is structured, the core product or service portfolio of the business and how technology is used. Typically organizations go through several stages in transforming themselves:
 Recognizing the need to change and gaining consensus amongst stakeholders that change is necessary
 Agreeing what form the change should take, the objectives of the change and a vision that describes a better future
 Understanding what the organization is changing from and what needs to change in detail 
 Designing the new organizational way of working and its support and management
 Testing and implementing changes, usually in waves (this may take place over a number of years)
 Bedding in the change so that the organization cannot move back to how it was and achieves the intended benefits

Business transformation can lead to developing new competencies and making better use of existing competencies.

Transformation examples
Examples of organisational transformation include:
 General Motors' transformation and restructuring (around 2009)
 BBC's Delivering Quality First programme (since 2011)
 Box's pivot from consumer to enterprise (around 2009-2010)
 British Airways' strategic transformation programme in response to low cost airlines (around 2004-2005)

References

Business terms
Information technology management
Strategic management